James & Lister Lea was an architectural and property consultancy firm active in England between 1846 and 2001. Established by brothers James Lea and Lister Lea, the partnership was initially focused only on architecture. Together, the brothers designed buildings across Birmingham, with a heavy focus on public houses, especially towards the end of the 19th century and early 20th century. Later in the firm's existence, it changed its name to James & Lister Lea and Sons. On 2 January 2001, the property consultancy firm merged with Bruton Knowles to produce a combined workforce of approximately 300 people.

The firm had offices on Bull Street, Birmingham and also in Knowle, West Midlands, although the Knowle office was sold in 1999 to agricultural surveyors Smith-Woolley. In May 2000, James & Lister Lea revealed that they were looking at rebranding the company in the future. In December 2000, Bruton Knowles and James & Lister Lea agreed a merger that would become effective on 2 January 2001. The merger, which did not involve any exchange of money between the two companies, led to the formation of one of the largest property consultancy firms in Birmingham.

As an architectural practice, the firm has been responsible for some of Birmingham's most recognisable public houses, many of which are now listed buildings.

Notable works
The Woodman, Albert Street, Birmingham (1896-7)
Swan and Mitre, Lichfield Road, Birmingham (1898-9)
The Market Tavern, Moseley Street, Birmingham (1899-1900)
The White Swan, Bradford Street, Digbeth, Birmingham (1899-1900)
Anchor Inn, Bradford Street, Digbeth, Birmingham (1901)
The Bartons Arms, High Street, Aston, Birmingham (1901)
City Tavern, Bishopsgate Street, Ladywood, Birmingham (1901)
The Red Lion, Soho Road, Birmingham (1901-2)
Aston Hippodrome, Potters Lane, Aston, Birmingham (1908; alterations in 1912. Demolished 1980)
39 Newdegate Street (Lloyds Bank), Nuneaton, Warwickshire (1911)
The George and Dragon, Albion Street, Jewellery Quarter, Birmingham (extension – 1922)
The British Oak, Pershore Street, Stirchley, Birmingham (1923-4)

References

External links
Bruton Knowles

Defunct companies based in Birmingham, West Midlands
English theatre architects
Architecture firms based in Birmingham, West Midlands
1846 establishments in England
British companies established in 1846
2001 disestablishments in England
British companies disestablished in 2001